Xiaoba is a town under the administration of Qingtongxia, Ningxia, China. , it has nine villages under its administration.

References 

Township-level divisions of Ningxia
Qingtongxia